The Takahashi Cabinet is the 20th Cabinet of Japan led by Takahashi Korekiyo from November 4, 1921 to June 12, 1922.

Cabinet

References 

Cabinet of Japan
1921 establishments in Japan
Cabinets established in 1921
Cabinets disestablished in 1922